Jalan Sabak, Federal Route 187, is a federal road in Kelantan, Malaysia.

At most sections, the Federal Route 187 was built under the JKR R5 road standard, with a speed limit of 90 km/h.

List of junctions and towns

References

Malaysian Federal Roads